Leho Tedersoo (born 3 April 1980) is an Estonian mycologist and microbiologist.

He has described the following taxon: 
 Coltricia australica L.W.Zhou, Tedersoo & Y.C.Dai, 2013

References

1980 births
Estonian mycologists
Estonian microbiologists
University of Tartu alumni
Living people
Place of birth missing (living people)